Meacock is a surname. Notable people with the surname include:

 Bob Meacock (1910–after 1938), English footballer
 Kevin Meacock (born 1963), English footballer
 Lucy Meacock (born 20th century), English TV presenter and journalist